Shetland is an archipelago in Scotland.

Shetland may also refer to:

Animals
 Shetland animal breeds, including:
 Shetland cattle
 Shetland goose
 Shetland pony
 Shetland sheep
 Shetland Sheepdog

Places
 Shetland, Ontario, Canada
 South Shetland Islands, a group of Antarctic islands

Other uses
 Shetland Bus was the nickname of a clandestine special operations group that made a permanent link between Shetland, Scotland and German-occupied Norway from 1941 until 1945
 Shetland dialect, known as simply "Shetland" by locals
 Shetland (Scottish Parliament constituency)
 Shetland (TV series), a crime television drama airing on BBC1, set in the Shetland Islands
 Short Shetland, a 1940s British flying boat